Nayagram Assembly constituency is an assembly constituency in Jhargram district in the Indian state of West Bengal. It is reserved for scheduled tribes.

Overview
As per orders of the Delimitation Commission, No. 220 Nayagram Assembly constituency (ST) is composed of the following: Nayagram and Gopiballavpur I community development blocks, and Chorchita, Kuliana and Nota gram panchayats of Gopiballavpur II CD Block.

Nayagram Assembly constituency (ST) is part of No. 33 Jhargram (Lok Sabha constituency) (ST).

Election results

2021

2016

2011

1977-2006
In 2006 and 2001 state assembly elections Bhutnath Saren of CPI(M) won the Nayagram assembly seat defeating Shunaram Mahali of Trinamool Congress in 2006 and Mangal Hansda of JMM in 2001. Contests in most years were multi cornered but only winners and runners are being mentioned. Subhas Chandra Saren of CPI(M) defeated Madhu Sudan Saren of Congress in 1996. Ananta Saren of CPI(M) defeated Bishnu Saren of Jharkhand Party in 1991, Dasarathi Saren of Congress in 1987, and Liba Chand Tudu, Independent, in 1982. Budhadeb Singh of CPI(M) defeated Subodh Handa of Janata Party in 1977.

1962-1972
Dasarathi Saren of Congress won in 1972 and 1971. Jagarati Hansda of Bangla Congress won in 1969 and 1967. Debendranath Hansda won the Nayagram seat in 1962. Prior to that the Nayagram seat was not there.

References

Assembly constituencies of West Bengal
Politics of Jhargram district